Rafael Santos Borré Maury (born 15 September 1995) is a Colombian professional footballer who plays as a forward for Bundesliga club Eintracht Frankfurt and the Colombia national team.

Succeeding his early career with Deportivo Cali, Borré signed with Spanish club Atlético Madrid in 2015, where he was loaned back to Cali until 2016; that same year, Borré was loaned out to La Liga counterpart Villareal CF. In 2017, Borré joined Argentine giant River Plate and won several titles during his time with the club, including the 2018 Copa Libertadores and the 2019 Recopa Sudamericana. Before his departure from the club, Borré consolidated himself as River Plate's top scorer of the renowned Marcelo Gallardo era with 55 goals. He returned to European football in 2021, signing for Bundesliga club Eintracht Frankfurt. He helped the side conquer their second Europa League title in 2022, also scoring Eintracht's equalizer and winning penalty (5–4) in the final against Rangers; for his contributions, Borré was named in the 2021–22 UEFA Europa League Team of the Year.

At youth level, Borré represented Colombia at the South American U-20 Championship and the FIFA U-20 World Cup in 2015. He made his senior debut in 2019 and has since collected over ten caps; Borré was part of the Colombia squad that finished third at the 2021 Copa América.

Club career

Deportivo Cali
Borré began his career with Deportivo Cali, and earned himself a name as a prolific goalscorer, which garnered the attention of some of Europe's biggest clubs. In August 2015, Borré was seen in the training grounds of Atlético Madrid. He signed for them on 28 August 2015, penning a six-year deal. However, he went back on loan to Deportivo Cali. On 25 March 2016, Borré suffered an injury. He did not play until 1 May, coming on as a 64-minute substitute for Andrés Felipe Roa in a 3–2 win against Alianza Petrolera. Borré played his next match on 15 May against Jaguares de Córdoba. There he scored his team's second goal in a 3–2 win.

Villarreal
On 13 August 2016, Borré joined Spanish club Villarreal on loan from Atlético Madrid. On 23 February 2017, he scored his first goal for the club in a 1–0 win over AS Roma in Europa League Competition. Despite winning the match, Villarreal still lost the series by a 4–1 aggregate. On 1 March, he scored a brace in a 4–1 win over Osasuna, scoring twice in under 5 minutes.

River Plate
On 7 August 2017, Borré joined River Plate. On 23 November 2019, he scored River Plate's only goal in a 2–1 defeat to Flamengo in the Copa Libertadores final.

For the 2020 Argentine season, Borré was the league's top scorer with 12 goals in 20 league matches and has cemented himself as a star for Gallardo due to his goalscoring and work rate. In April 2021, Borre scored a poker, scoring four goals in one match in the league. He is the maximum goal scorer in the legendary Gallardo era with 54 goals and 20 assists as of 18 April.

On 1 July 2021, Santos Borré became a free agent.

Eintracht Frankfurt
On 5 July 2021, Santos Borré joined German club Eintracht Frankfurt. On 5 May 2022, he scored the winning goal in a 1–0 win over West Ham United in the second leg of the semi-finals of the Europa League, which helped his club to reach the final. In the final, Borré scored Eintracht's equalizer against Rangers, and the winning penalty (5–4) to win the competition for his team.

International career

Youth 
Borré had his first stint in international football with Colombia's U-20 team which participated at the 2014 Toulon Tournament, where he scored a goal against Qatar during Colombia's third group-stage match which ended in a 1–1 draw. Finally, Colombia were eliminated after finishing fourth in their group with Borré appearing in the entirety of Colombia's matches.

Borré was called up to Colombia's under-20 team to take part in the 2015 South American Youth Championship, where he scored two goals during the initial stage against Chile and Peru, respectively. Colombia finished as the tournament's runner-up, thus earning a spot at the 2015 FIFA U-20 World Cup in New Zealand.

At the U-20 World Cup, Borré managed to score a goal during Colombia's final group-stage match against Portugal; Colombia was eliminated in the round of 16 after losing 1–0 to the United States.

In March 2016, Borré was called up to Colombia's Olympic team to dispute the first-leg of the CONMEBOL–CONCACAF play-off against the United States for a spot at the 2016 Summer Olympics; Borré was substituted on in the 61st minute with the game ending 1–1 in Barranquilla. Despite Borré not being included in the second leg, Colombia secured qualification after winning 3–2 on aggregate.

Senior 
On 20 March 2015, Borré received his first call-up to Colombia's  senior team by coach José Pékerman for friendlies against Bahrain and Kuwait. However, he was an unused substitute in both matches.

He made his Colombia debut on 6 September 2019 in a friendly against Brazil, when he substituted Duván Zapata in the 83rd minute.

On 10 June 2021, Borré was named in Colombia manager Reinaldo Rueda's list for the 2021 Copa América. In total, Borré appeared in five matches as his country secured a third-place finish.

On 5 June 2022, Borré scored his first goal for Colombia during a 1–0 friendly win over Saudi Arabia. He netted another goal for his country on 24 September, Colombia's third in a 4–1 triumph against Guatemala.

Career statistics

Club

International

Honours 
Deportivo Cali
 Categoría Primera A: 2015 (Apertura)
 Superliga Colombiana: 2014

River Plate
 Copa Argentina: 2016–17, 2018–19
 Supercopa Argentina: 2017, 2019
 Copa Libertadores: 2018
 Recopa Sudamericana: 2019

Eintracht Frankfurt
 UEFA Europa League: 2021–22

Individual
 UEFA Europa League Team of the Season: 2021–22

References

External links 

 
 

1995 births
Living people
Footballers from Barranquilla
Association football forwards
Colombia youth international footballers
Colombia under-20 international footballers
Colombia international footballers
2015 South American Youth Football Championship players
2021 Copa América players
Categoría Primera A players
La Liga players
Argentine Primera División players
Bundesliga players
Deportivo Cali footballers
Atlético Madrid footballers
Villarreal CF players
Club Atlético River Plate footballers
Eintracht Frankfurt players
Copa Libertadores-winning players
UEFA Europa League winning players
Colombian expatriate footballers
Colombian expatriate sportspeople in Spain
Expatriate footballers in Spain
Colombian expatriate sportspeople in Argentina
Expatriate footballers in Argentina
Colombian expatriate sportspeople in Germany
Expatriate footballers in Germany